Joseph John Morrone, Jr (October 20, 1935 – September 16, 2015) was an American head men's collegiate soccer coach. He is the father of former soccer midfielder Joseph "Joe" M. Morrone He coached soccer at the University of Connecticut from 1969 to 1996 and is credited with transforming UConn's struggling soccer program into one of the nation's best. Morrone won the 1981 NCAA Division I Men's Soccer Championship at UConn. From 1981 to 1983, his teams reached the Final Four three times. His teams reached the NCAA tournament 16 out of the past 18 years he coached there.

Despite this success, from 1989 to 1996, his teams failed to reach the NCAA tournament, and he was asked to step down. He was replaced by another coaching legend, Ray Reid. UConn's soccer stadium, Morrone Stadium, is named after him. His career coaching record stands at 422-199-64. Morrone died on September 16, 2015 at the age of 79 from pancreatic cancer.

References

External links
http://www.nytimes.com/1997/01/26/nyregion/the-troubling-retirement-of-a-soccer-coach.html

1935 births
2015 deaths
UConn Huskies men's soccer coaches
Sportspeople from Worcester, Massachusetts
UMass Minutemen ice hockey players
UMass Minutemen lacrosse players
UMass Minutemen soccer players
Worcester State University alumni
Association footballers not categorized by position
American soccer coaches
American soccer players